Maoricrypta costata, or the ribbed slipper shell, is a species of intertidal medium-sized sea snail, a marine gastropod mollusc in the family Calyptraeidae. This species occurs along the east coast of the North Island, New Zealand.

References

Calyptraeidae
Gastropods of New Zealand
Gastropods described in 1824